The Naval Discipline Act 1957 was an Act of the Parliament of the United Kingdom governing discipline in the Royal Navy. It governed courts-martial and criminal penalties for crimes committed by officers and ratings of the Royal Navy. It was substantially replaced at the end of 2008 by the Armed Forces Act 2006, which created a unified code of military law for all three British Armed Forces. The whole Naval Discipline Act was repealed in October 2009.

Amendments
The Armed Forces Act 1981 amended certain aspects of the Act; most notably, it abolished the death penalty for the crime of espionage for the enemy on ships or in naval establishments. The Human Rights Act 1998 abolished the death penalty for all other capital crimes under the Act.

In 2004, courts martial in the Royal Navy were reformed by an order issued by the parliamentary Joint Committee on Human Rights. The Committee found that the appointment of serving naval officers as Judge Advocates, and their appointment by the Chief Naval Judge Advocate (also a serving officer), undermined the independence and impartiality of courts martial, thereby contravening human rights legislation. The Order instructed that all judge advocates should be appointed solely by the Judge Advocate of the Fleet, a civilian circuit judge.

References

External links

United Kingdom Acts of Parliament 1957
Royal Navy
1957 in military history
United Kingdom military law